Ravenala is a genus of monocotyledonous flowering plants. Classically, the genus was considered to include a single species, Ravenala madagascariensis, commonly known as the traveller's tree, traveller's palm or East-West palm, from Madagascar.  It is not a true palm (family Arecaceae) but a member of the family Strelitziaceae. The genus is closely related to the southern African genus Strelitzia and the South American genus Phenakospermum.  Some older classifications include these genera in the banana family (Musaceae). Although it is usually considered to be a single species, four different forms have been distinguished. Five other species were described in 2021, all from Madagascar: Ravenala agatheae Haev. & Razanats., R. blancii Haev., V.Jeannoda & A.Hladik, R. grandis Haev., Razanats, A.Hladik & P.Blanc, R. hladikorum Haev., Razanats., V. Jeannoda & P.Blanc, R. madagascariensis Sonn., et R. menahirana Haev. & Razanats.

Name
It has been given the name  "traveller's palm" because the sheaths of the stems hold rainwater, which supposedly could be used as an emergency drinking supply for needy travellers. Another plausible reason for its name is that the fan tends to grow on an east–west line, providing a crude compass.

The scientific name Ravenala comes from Malagasy ravinala or ravina ala meaning "forest leaves".

Description
The enormous paddle-shaped leaves are borne on long petioles, in a distinctive fan shape aligned in a single plane (distichous). The large white flowers are structurally similar to those of its relatives, the bird-of-paradise flowers Strelitzia reginae and Strelitzia nicolai, but are generally considered less attractive, with a green bract. These flowers, upon being pollinated, produce brilliant blue seeds. In tropical and subtropical regions, the plant is widely cultivated for its distinctive habit and foliage. As the plant grows older, it progressively loses the lowest or oldest leaves and reveals a sturdy grey trunk. Of the four forms, varieties or subspecies, the largest is the "Bemavo", from the hills of eastern Madagascar, which can be 100 feet (30 metres) in height with a trunk 2 feet (60 cm) thick. The foliar fan consists of 30 to 45 leaves for mature specimens, each as much as 36 feet (11  metres) in length.

The chromosome number is 2n = 22.

Range and habitat
Ravenala madagascariensis is widespread in Madagascar, including humid lowland forests, montane forests, grassland, and rocky areas, from sea level to 1,500 meters elevation.

Ecology
Ruffed lemurs are a known pollinator of this plant, and given the size and structure of the inflorescences, as well as the lemur's selectivity, method of feeding, and long muzzle, this relationship is thought to have coevolved.

Cultivation
The plant requires a sunny spot (not full sun until it is larger). It responds well to fertiliser, especially if it is high in nitrogen during the growing season. This produces better growth and foliage.

Gallery

References

External links

 Floridata.com: Ravenala madagascariensis
 Madacamp.com/Ravinala
 University of Florida — Ravenala madagascariensis

Strelitziaceae
Monotypic Zingiberales genera
Endemic flora of Madagascar
Flora of the Madagascar lowland forests
Flora of the Madagascar subhumid forests
Flora of the Madagascar dry deciduous forests
Garden plants of Africa
Ornamental trees